The 1901–02 collegiate men's basketball season in the United States began in December 1901, progressed through the regular season, and concluded in March 1902.

Rule changes

 An early form of dribbling became legal; previously, players were not allowed to bounce the ball at all and could advance it only by passing. The new dribbling rule did not permit continuous dribbling in the modern sense; instead, a player could bounce a ball only once and then recover it, and the bounce had to be higher than his head. A player was allowed to bounce and recover the ball in this way as many times in a row as he wanted or pass the ball to another player after any single-bounce dribble, but he was not allowed to shoot the ball after a dribble. The rule limited dribbling to a defensive tactic in which a player in effect passed the ball to himself. Continuous dribbling — dribbling in its modern sense — was not permitted until the 1909–10 season.

Season headlines 

 The Eastern Intercollegiate Basketball League began play, with five original members.
 Minnesota went undefeated (15–0).
 In February 1943, the Helms Athletic Foundation retroactively selected Minnesota as its national champion for the 1901–02 season.
 In 1995, the Premo-Porretta Power Poll retroactively selected Minnesota as its national champion for the 1901–02 season.

Conference membership changes

Regular season

Conference winners 

NOTE: The Western Conference (the future Big Ten Conference) did not sponsor an official conference season or recognize a regular-season champion until the 1905–06 season. In 1901–02, Minnesota (15–0) went undefeated.

Statistical leaders

Coaching changes

References